Ceriagrion mourae is a species of damselfly in the family Coenagrionidae endemic to eastern Sub-Saharan Africa, most commonly in Mozambique and Tanzania. Being a relatively uncommon sub-species of dragonflies, it is largely unknown to anyone beyond animal conservatives and researchers. Its natural habitats are subtropical or tropical moist lowland forests and freshwater marshes.

References

Sources

Coenagrionidae
Insects described in 1969
Taxonomy articles created by Polbot